Luftschutzpolizei (LSP) (Air Raid Protection Police)  was the local civil defense organization in Nazi Germany.

Formation
LSP was the civil protection service in charge of rescuing victims of bombings in connection with the Technische Nothilfe (Technical Emergency Service) and the Feuerschutzpolizei (professional fire departments). Created as the Security and Assistance Service (Sicherheits und Hilfsdienst (SHD)) in 1935, it was renamed "Luftschutzpolizei" in April 1942, when transferred from the aegis of Ministry of Aviation to the Ordnungspolizei.
The transfer took place as part of the reorganization of the German civil defense caused by the heavy casualties suffered from Allied bombings of civilian targets. The local SHD was transferred to the Ordnungspolizei as Luftschutzpolizei. The mobile reserve columns were transferred to the Luftwaffe, as motorized rescue battalions, and greatly expanded.

Organization
The LSP belonged to the Technical Auxiliary Police together with the Technical Emergency Service and the volunteer fire departments. It was subordinate to the local civil defense commander (the local state or municipal police commissioner), and under the direct leadership of the local protection police commander (Kommandeuer der Schutzpolizei), who exercised tactical command during air raid protection operations. In Hauptamt Ordnungspolizei, civil defense matters were handled by the Inspectorate of Air Raid Protection and Air Raid Protection Police.

The LSP contained the following services:
 Fire-fighting and decontamination service (FE)
 Repair, demolition and rescue services (I)
 Medical and first aid service (S)
 Veterinary first aid service (V)
 Specialized technical squads (H)

The LSP was organized in Abteilungen (battalions), Bereitschaften (companies), Züge (platoons), Gruppen (squads), and Trupps (teams).

The LSP in Hamburg, had in 1943 9,300 members, organized as follows:
 30 F-companies
 18 F-platoons (water)
 8 Decontamination parks
 18 I-companies
 13 I-parks
 13 S-companies
 72 Medical air raid centers
 3 Medical supply depots
 7 Veterinary air raid centers
 5 H-companies.

Materiel

A Fire-fighting company was, according to the table of equipment, outfitted with the following vehicles. In reality, this standard could not always be maintained.
 2 Fire engines LF-25 with a capacity of 2,500 liters water per minute.
 2 Fire engines LF-15 with a capacity of 1,500 liters water per minute.
 2 Fire engines LF-8 with a capacity of 800 liters water per minute.
 1 Hose vehicle
 1 Ladder truck, large

Personnel
The personnel was made up of men over conscription age, drafted into full-time civil defense service. Allied intelligence sources believed the mean age was 45 years old. The manpower needs of the Wehrmacht, the industry, and the economy had priority over the LSP. As a result, only 70% of the billets in the table of organization could be filled. Many of the men were of questionable physical stamina. As members of the LSP they were also members of the reserve police. Officers of the LSP were trained at the Police Academy for Air Raid Protection Tactics, at Berlin-Schöneberg. While in uniform or performing an official duty, they were subject to the special SS and police jurisdiction.

Ranks

References

Notes

Cited literature

 
 
 
 
 
 
 
 
 

Police forces of Nazi Germany
Police of Nazi Germany
Organizations established in 1942
Civil defense
1942 establishments in Germany